"Around the Way Girl" is the third single by LL Cool J from his 1990 album Mama Said Knock You Out. The song later appeared on LL Cool J's 1996 greatest hits album, All World: Greatest Hits. "Around the Way Girl" peaked at #9 on the Billboard Hot 100, becoming LL Cool J's first top 10 single. It was also a hit on the R&B and dance music charts, where it peaked at #5 and #7, respectively. The Recording Industry Association of America (RIAA) certified "Around the Way Girl" Gold on January 15, 1991, for sales of over 500,000 copies.

The song prominently samples Mary Jane Girls' 1983 breakout hit song, "All Night Long," along with Keni Burke's 1982 hit "Risin' to the Top", from which "All Night Long" had originally taken its bassline. The "All Night Long" sample ("you got me shook up, shook down, shook out on your loving...") is heard during the song's intro and at the end of the choruses, while the melody from "Risin' to the Top" is sampled during the verses.

Music video
The music video was filmed in what used to be a warehouse on Borden Avenue in Long Island City, Queens. The clip was directed by Paris Barclay.

Single track listing

A-side
"Around The Way Girl" (LP Version)- 4:05 
"Around The Way Girl" (Untouchables Remix feat. Chad Jones)- 4:32

B-side
"Around The Way Girl" (Instrumental)- 3:51 
"Murdergram" (LP Version)- 3:52

Official versions
 "Around the Way Girl" (Album Version) / (LP Version) - 4:05 
 "Around the Way Girl" (Instrumental) - 3:51 
 "Around the Way Girl" (Untouchables Remix feat. Chad Jones) - 4:32

Charts

Weekly charts

Year-end charts

References

1990 songs
1990 singles
LL Cool J songs
Songs written by LL Cool J
Songs written by Rick James
Songs written by Marley Marl
Def Jam Recordings singles
Song recordings produced by Marley Marl
New jack swing songs
American pop songs